Chennault refers to Claire Lee Chennault, an American military aviator

Chennault may also refer to:

Claire Lee Chennault, United States military aviator
Anna Chennault, widow of Claire Lee Chennault
Chennault International Airport, near Lake Charles, Louisiana, United States, named for Claire Lee Chennault
Chennault, Georgia, an unincorporated community in the United States

See also
Chenault, a surname
Chennault House (disambiguation)